Anthony Banning Norton (May 15, 1821 - December 31, 1893) was an American journalist, historian and state politician. He was the publisher of newspapers in Ohio and Texas, and a Know Nothing member of the Texas House of Representatives. He later served as the postmaster of Dallas, Texas, and a United States Marshal for North Texas. He was the author of three books.

Early life
Anthony Banning Norton was born on May 15, 1821, in Mount Vernon, Ohio. His parents, Daniel Sheldon Norton and Sarah Banning, were planters from Louisiana. His brother, Daniel Sheldon Norton, became a politician.

Norton "graduated from Kenyon College in 1840" and studied the Law in Pennsylvania.

Career
Norton joined the Whig Party, and he published The True Whig and Chippewa War Club, later known as Norton's Daily True Whig, a newspaper in Mount Vernon from 1848 to 1855.

Norton joined the Know Nothing political party, and he served as a member of the Texas House of Representatives from 1855 to 1861. He was also an Adjutant General appointed by Governor Sam Houston.

He founded “the Fort Worth Chief”, the town’s first newspaper.

After the American Civil War, Norton was the publisher of another newspaper, Norton's Union Intelligencer. He became the postmaster of Dallas, Texas in 1875, and a United States Marshal for North Texas in 1879.

Norton was the author of three books.

Personal life and death
Norton was married three times. With his first wife, H. Ellen Burr, he had two children. In 1857, he married H. Maria Neyland, and they had three children. In 1892, he married Mary Martin.

Norton died on December 31, 1893, in Dallas, Texas.

Works
A History of Knox County, Ohio, from 1779 to 1862 (1862)
The Great Revolution of 1840, Reminiscences of the Log Cabin and Hard Cider Campaign (1888)
Tippecanoe Songs of the Log Cabin Boys and Girls of 1840 (1888)

References

1821 births
1893 deaths
People from Mount Vernon, Ohio
People from Dallas
Kenyon College alumni
Editors of Ohio newspapers
19th-century American newspaper editors
Members of the Texas House of Representatives
Texas Know Nothings
Texas postmasters
United States Marshals